Tropicália: A Brazilian Revolution in Sound is a 2006 compilation album released by Soul Jazz Records.

Release
Tropicália: A Brazilian Revolution in Sound was initially set for release in 2005, the album was pushed to February 13, 2006 to tie in with a Tropicalia festival at the Barbican in London. The festival had nearly every artist featured on the compilation. The album was re-released in 2010.

Reception

At Metacritic, which assigns a normalised rating out of 100 to reviews from mainstream critics, the album has received an average score of 93, indicating universal acclaim, based on 10 reviews. Richard Williams of The Guardian" commented that the artists on the album "brim with youthful inventiveness, blending funk grooves, Brazilian energy, a restrained hint of primitive Haight-Ashbury psychedelics, a sense of humour that transcends linguistic boundaries and a Beatlesque sense of limitless possibilities expressed in the use of orchestral resources alongside the usual beat-group or samba-combo instrumentation." that were "Wildly original, often leaping off in several directions at once, veering at will from a kind of beach-party jug band to a warped version of the soft rock of the Mamas and the Papas or the Fifth Dimension, they make you want to go straight out and buy everything this amazing group ever recorded." Joe Tangari declared that the compilation takes "an extremely focused look at six of the most important and influential Tropicália artists, [...] responsible for some of the most bracing records Brazil ever produced-- and though omissions are certain to be an issue for cratedigging obsessives, this collection is as flawless a primer as has ever been made available on a single disc."

Track listing
Track listing adapted from the liner notes.

Credits
Credits adapted from the vinyl liner notes.
 Stuart Baker – compiler, sleeve notes
 Adrian Self – sleeve designer
 Toothé Grim – sleeve designer
 Pete Reilly – mastering
 Duncan Cowell – mastering

References

Footnotes

Sources
 
 
 
 
 

2006 compilation albums
Soul Jazz Records compilation albums
Tropicália compilation albums
Portuguese-language compilation albums